The following are the national records in athletics in Poland maintained by its national athletics federation: Polski Związek Lekkiej Atletyki (PZLA).

Outdoor

Key to tables:

+ = en route to a longer distance

h = hand timing

Men

Women

Mixed

Indoor

Men

Women

Mixed

Notes

References
General
Polish Records - Outdoor 8 June 2021 updated
Polish Records - Indoor 31 December 2022 updated
Specific

External links
 PZLA web site

Poland
Records
Athletics
Athletics